The murder of Karel Van Noppen was a high-profile assassination of a government livestock inspector in Belgium in 1995. Van Noppen had been investigating illegal practices by farmers and businessmen in Belgium and was shot dead by assailants outside his house in the village of Wechelderzande in the Province of Antwerp. A number of people connected with the illegal supply of growth hormones to livestock were sentenced in connection with the murder.

"Hormone Mafia"
The use of growth hormones on livestock has the potential to increase the profit per animal between ten and 100 percent. However, the use of such hormones has been banned by the European Union since 1989 and so organised crime, motivated by the immense profits, moved into the business. This was a particular concern in Belgium, where several government inspectors had been threatened or had attempts made on their lives.

Murder
In February 1995, 43-year-old Karel Van Noppen, who had been investigating the phenomenon, was shot dead outside his front door. The killing provoked outrage throughout Belgium, with a torchlight procession led by his widow in Flanders and calls to investigate and better regulate the cattle industry. In 2002, a court sentenced Albert Barrez, Carl de Schutter and Germain Daenen to 25 years each for their roles in the murder, while another man, Alex Vercauteren received a life sentence without parole.

In popular culture
The 2011 Belgian crime drama Bullhead, directed by Michaël R. Roskam, with Matthias Schoenaerts in a leading role, is loosely based on the incident and the hormone mafia.

References

People murdered by organized crime
People murdered in Belgium
Organized crime events in Belgium
Belgian murder victims
Growth hormones
Murder of Karel Van Noppen
1995 murders in Belgium
February 1995 events in Europe